Czech Republic–South Korea relations are foreign relations between the Czech Republic and South Korea.

History
The foreign relations between the Czech Republic and South Korea were established on March 22, 1990.

In November 2018, South Korean President Moon Jae-In vowed to expand bilateral cooperation with the Czech Republic. While visiting Prague en route to a G20 summit, Moon and Czech Prime Minister Andrej Babis agreed to seek increase cooperation into various new sectors, including artificial intelligence.

In November 2020, South Korea, along with Russia, bid for the $6.74 billion construction of the Dukovany Nuclear Power Station, of which the groundbreaking is scheduled for 2029 and the project are forecast to completed in 2036. The CEO of the Czech power utility CEZ Daniel Benes said that the winner would be selected by the end of 2022.

Zuzana Stichova, the head of the Czech Foreign Ministry’s Public Affairs Bureau, raised questions about South Korea's law against anti-Pyongyang leaflets which had passed in December 2020. She projected that there will be intra-E.U. discussions on Seoul's measure in the near future, implying that it may become an agenda item not only in the Czech Republic but also in the European Union.

Migration
As of 2018, there were 2,673 South Korean citizen with a residence permit in the Czech Republic.

Trade and economy

As of 2015, South Korea was Czech Republic's third largest business partner outside the EU. In 2015, the Czech Republic and South Korea signed a strategic partnership agreement with the aim stated by Czech prime minister Sobotka to expand business ties beyond the sphere of car manufacture into defense, infrastructure and nuclear power, as well as rail transportation. In 2018, bilateral trade between the two countries neared $3 billion.

In terms of tourism, South Korea is the Czech Republic's eight-largest source of visitors as of 2019, with 416,000 nationals visiting the country, following 417,000 in 2017 and 325,000 in 2016. In 2019, the Czech Republic applied a program to automate immigration clearance for South Koreans; consequently, South Korea is the only non-European Union country, whose nationals are eligible for the e-gate clearance system.

Diplomatic missions

The Czech Republic has an embassy in Seoul.
South Korea has an embassy in Prague.

See also
Foreign relations of the Czech Republic
Foreign relations of South Korea
South Korea–European Union relations
Koreans in the Czech Republic
List of diplomatic missions of the Czech Republic
List of diplomatic missions of South Korea

References

Further reading
Shoiw-Mei Tseng. Trade Flows between Czech Republic and East Asia (PFD full text). January 2013.